The Passaic Flood in Northern New Jersey began on October 9, 1903, and lasted through October 11. Bridges and dams along the Passaic and Ramapo Rivers were destroyed, including a  dam at Pompton Lakes, New Jersey. The flood, the most severe in the region since the American Colonial Period, caused $7 million in damage (equivalent to $ million in ). The Edison Manufacturing Company produced a short documentary film, Flood Scene in Paterson, N.J., shot a few days after the flood.

References

Natural disasters in New Jersey
1903 floods in the United States
1903 natural disasters in the United States
October 1903 events